The 2000 Bryant Bulldogs football team represented Bryant College aas a member the Central Division of the Eastern Football Conference (EFC)during the 2000 NCAA Division II football season. The Bulldogs were led by second-year head coach Jim Miceli and played their home games at Bulldog Stadium. Bryant compiled an overall record of 4–6 with a mark of 3–5 in conference play, tying for fourth place in the EFC's Central Division.

Schedule

References

Bryant
Bryant Bulldogs football seasons
Bryant Bulldogs football